Luke Dunstan (born 29 January 1995) is an Australian rules footballer currently playing for the Melbourne Football Club in the Australian Football League (AFL), having previously played for the St Kilda Football Club. As an under-18 he played for the Woodville-West Torrens Football Club in the South Australian National Football League (SANFL).

Career
Dunstan was drafted by St Kilda in the 2013 AFL Draft from the Woodville-West Torrens Football Club in the South Australian National Football League (SANFL). Before he was playing for the Woodville-West Torrens Football Club, Dunstan played for South Clare Sports Club in the North Eastern Football League in the Mid North.

In Round 1, 2014, he played his first game for St Kilda against Melbourne. He was awarded the AFL Rising Star nomination for his performance.

Dunstan became an integral part of St Kilda's midfield over the course of 2014 before bowing out after round 19 for shoulder surgery. Following his last game in round 23, St Kilda icon and Dunstan's mentor Lenny Hayes handed his number 7 guernsey over to Dunstan. Soon afterwards, Dunstan signed a contract extension, keeping him at the Saints until 2017.

Dunstan turned his back on a potential move home to South Australia after playing an important role in the Saints' climb to ninth in 2016. The 22-year-old averaged 17 disposals from 18 games in 2016, before being forced to undergo his second shoulder reconstruction in three years – but this time to his opposite (left) shoulder.

In 2017, Dunstan signed a two-year contract extension with St Kilda to remain at the club until the end of 2019.

The move was documented in the Stan series Show Me The Money.

Statistics
Updated to the end of the 2022 season.

|-
| 2014 ||  || 36
| 16 || 9 || 6 || 143 || 157 || 300 || 59 || 60 || 0.6 || 0.4 || 8.9 || 9.8 || 18.8 || 3.7 || 3.8 || 2
|-
| 2015 ||  || 7
| 19 || 12 || 8 || 168 || 156 || 324 || 62 || 70 || 0.6 || 0.4 || 8.8 || 8.2 || 17.1 || 3.3 || 3.7 || 0
|-
| 2016 ||  || 7
| 18 || 5 || 11 || 131 || 182 || 313 || 44 || 86 || 0.3 || 0.6 || 7.3 || 10.1 || 17.4 || 2.4 || 4.8 || 0
|-
| 2017 ||  || 7
| 16 || 10 || 9 || 166 || 180 || 346 || 67 || 79 || 0.6 || 0.6 || 10.4 || 11.3 || 21.6 || 4.2 || 4.9 || 1
|-
| 2018 ||  || 7
| 16 || 5 || 5 || 178 || 169 || 347 || 56 || 70 || 0.3 || 0.3 || 11.1 || 10.6 || 21.7 || 3.5 || 4.4 || 0
|-
| 2019 ||  || 7
| 18 || 4 || 12 || 208 || 194 || 402 || 59 || 87 || 0.2 || 0.7 || 11.6 || 10.8 || 22.3 || 3.3 || 4.8 || 2
|-
| 2020 ||  || 7
| 1 || 0 || 0 || 13 || 8 || 21 || 3 || 9 || 0.0 || 0.0 || 13.0 || 8.0 || 21.0 || 3.0 || 9.0 || 1
|-
| 2021 ||  || 7
| 12 || 1 || 4 || 169 || 134 || 303 || 51 || 59 || 0.1 || 0.3 || 14.1 || 11.2 || 25.3 || 4.3 || 4.9 || 11
|-
| 2022 ||  || 27
| 5 || 0 || 1 || 22 || 41 || 63 || 10 || 11 || 0.0 || 0.2 || 4.4 || 8.2 || 12.6 || 2.0 || 2.2 || 0
|- class=sortbottom
! colspan=3 | Career
! 121 !! 46 !! 56 !! 1198 !! 1221 !! 2419 !! 411 !! 531 !! 0.4 !! 0.5 !! 9.9 !! 10.1 !! 20.0 !! 3.4 !! 4.4 !! 17
|}

Notes

References

External links

1995 births
Living people
Woodville-West Torrens Football Club players
Australian rules footballers from South Australia
St Kilda Football Club players
Melbourne Football Club players